The Instituto Forestal (INFOR) or Instituto Forestal de Chile is a Chilean public service tasked with carrying out research and development programmes related to the forestry sector in Chile. It belongs to the belonging to the Ministry of Agriculture. Instituto Forestal begun in 1961 as a project by the Food and Agriculture Organization (FAO), but was officially created by the Government of Chile in 1965. Currently it has 5 centers in Chile.

 Sede metropolitana in Santiago
 Sede Bio Bio in San Pedro de la Paz
 Sede Valdivia in Valdivia
 Sede Diaguita in La Serena
 Sede Patagonia in Coyhaique

References

External links 
 Official site of Instituto Forestal

1961 establishments in Chile
Valdivia
Research institutes in Chile
La Serena, Chile
Aysén Region
Santiago, Chile
Forestry in Chile